The Kansas Turnpike is a , freeway-standard toll road that lies entirely within the US state of Kansas. It runs in a general southwest–northeast direction from the Oklahoma border to Kansas City. It passes through several major Kansas cities, including Wichita, Topeka, and Lawrence. The turnpike is owned and maintained by the Kansas Turnpike Authority (KTA), which is headquartered in Wichita.

The Kansas Turnpike was built from 1954 to 1956, predating the Interstate Highway System. While not part of the system's early plans, the turnpike was eventually incorporated into the Interstate System in late 1956 and is designated today as four different Interstate Highway routes: Interstate 35 (I-35), Interstate 335 (I-335), I-470, and I-70. The turnpike also carries a piece of two U.S. Highways: U.S. Highway 24 (US-24) and US-40 in Kansas City.

Because it predates the Interstate Highway System, the road is not engineered to current Interstate Highway standards and notably lacks a regulation-width median. To reduce the risk of head-on collisions, the Kansas Turnpike now has a continuous, permanent Jersey barrier in the median over its entire length.

Around 120,000 drivers use the turnpike daily. The road features numerous services, including a travel radio station and six service areas. One of these service areas is notable for the presence of a memorial to University of Notre Dame football coach Knute Rockne, who died near the current highway's route. The turnpike uses a ticket system of toll collection with distance-based tolls paid upon exiting the highway. An electronic toll collection system known as K-TAG is also available. The turnpike is self-sustaining; it derives its entire revenue from the tolls collected and requires no tax money for maintenance or administration.

History

Early history
Early federal plans for a nationwide system of interregional highways did not include a route along or near the present turnpike, instead connecting Oklahoma City and Kansas City via southeastern Kansas and US-69. By the mid-1940s, this route had shifted to roughly the present I-35 alignment, serving Wichita. The only major difference from the present route was between Wichita and Emporia, where the highway ran north to Newton before turning northeast along US-50.

In the early 1950s, toll roads were gaining in popularity as a mechanism for funding new superhighways. This trend started with the Pennsylvania Turnpike in 1940, which was mimicked by other toll roads in New York, New Jersey, several New England states, Ohio, and Colorado. In October 1951, the Highway Council of the Kansas Chamber of Commerce researched the possibility of integrating the state into a potential cross-country turnpike system. Eastern Kansas was also included in an interstate turnpike system stretching from Galveston, Texas, to Saint Louis, Missouri, via Kansas City, that was proposed by Oklahoma Governor Johnston Murray. Many firms from construction industries, as well as those concerned about the state's economic development, worked to have legislation passed to allow the turnpike to be constructed. Governor Ed Arn and Gale Moss, the State Highway Director, were two major proponents of the turnpike concept.

The turnpike idea was an attractive one because initial construction was to be financed by the private sector via sales of revenue bonds, allowing state highway funds to be used for other important projects. The new toll road would also reduce traffic, and thus maintenance costs, on existing roads. There was also a concern that if Kansas lagged behind in turnpike construction, it might be bypassed by toll roads in other states, leaving it at an economic disadvantage. The toll concept also had the benefit of ultimately putting the financial burden on the drivers who actually used the road, instead of using tax revenue that had been collected from residents statewide. There was some opposition to the plan from both government officials and citizens due to concerns that the toll revenue might not cover the repayments to investors, bankrupting the turnpike authority and burdening the state government with the remaining debt. There were also worries about the possibility of the turnpike requiring maintenance before the bonds had been repaid. Some critics also felt that the high speeds typical of turnpike driving were unsafe. As right-of-way for the project was obtained, the turnpike drew additional opposition from farmers and ranchers, who objected to the turnpike bisecting their property, making it difficult to access disjointed parcels of land.

The Kansas Chamber of Commerce held "turnpike clinics" in several locations across Kansas in 1952, reporting an overwhelmingly positive reception from the public. The Kansas Turnpike Act, defining a turnpike from Oklahoma to Kansas City, became effective April 7, 1953. It created the KTA, with Gale Moss selected as its first chairman. With a budget of only $25,000 (equivalent to $ in ), the KTA's first office was a former barbershop in the Kansas State Capitol.

Given Oklahoma's plans to build a turnpike north from Oklahoma City to the Kansas state line, and taking into account traffic flow maps prepared by the highway department, a preliminary route was chosen connecting the proposed Oklahoma turnpike to Kansas City via Wichita and Topeka. A second route extending from Topeka to Salina and further west to the Colorado state line (the modern-day I-70 corridor) was also studied. Over 173,000 drivers were surveyed to determine how many of them would be willing to use the two proposed routes in order to establish their profitability. While the western Kansas route was determined not to be feasible, the Oklahoma–Kansas City route was projected to generate a total revenue of $9 million in 1957 (equivalent to $ in ). After considering a number of different alignments, including one bypassing Topeka via the present route of I-35, the state decided on an "airline" route between Wichita and Topeka. From Wichita south, the turnpike was to parallel US-81, continuing into Oklahoma; the interchange with US-166 at South Haven was included to provide an outlet if Oklahoma lagged in its construction. The turnpike was to parallel US-40 from Topeka to Kansas City. The Kansas City end was set at 18th Street and Muncie Boulevard, which was to be extended and upgraded to a freeway (the Muncie Expressway) to the Intercity Viaduct by the state.

After a ruling from the state supreme court that found that the KTA could issue bonds and oversee the construction and administration of the turnpike, the turnpike authority sold $160 million (equivalent to $ in ) in revenue bonds in September 1954. KTA bonds were quickly bought by investors, who were attracted by the Kansas Turnpike's low construction costs—only one-third of that of turnpikes in other states—and projections showing that enough tolls would be collected to pay off investors after 19 years.

Ground was broken on December 31, 1954, at the Kansas River bridge near Lawrence. Construction of the entire length of the turnpike was scheduled to take place all at once, with the turnpike partitioned into 14 parts, and the overall length also divided into 43 smaller portions. The KTA sent out letters en masse to the affected landowners, offering a price and referring appeals to the local district court, which typically valued the land at a lesser amount; this methodology was not without criticism. During the construction period, the state highway department suffered a "brain drain" as many staffers resigned to take up KTA jobs, which paid better salaries (Chairman Moss's KTA salary was three times that of his salary as director of highways) and offered more exciting challenges.

After almost 22 months of construction, the road was opened for a day of free travel on October 20, 1956, between 6:00 am and 2:00 pm. An estimated 12,000 to 15,000 cars traveled on the turnpike. Many of those motorists traveled to Lawrence for a football game between the University of Kansas and University of Oklahoma. Official opening ceremonies were held at interchanges in each of the three major cities on October 25. The Kansas City celebration included Gene Autry jumping his horse through a large paper map of the turnpike. John Masefield, the British Poet Laureate, wrote a tribute to commemorate the occasion. On the first day after the official opening, 7,197 vehicles traveled the turnpike, with 81 toll collectors and 50 maintenance workers on duty. The turnpike originally had 14 interchanges; by 2012, there were 22.

Southern terminus
Despite Oklahoma's role in instigating the construction of the Kansas Turnpike, its plans for a connecting turnpike fell through. The Oklahoma Turnpike Authority (OTA) had not performed a traffic study, as the KTA had, to prove that the proposed Oklahoma turnpike would be profitable. Oklahoma also suffered from a poorer credit rating than did Kansas. Additionally, by this time, many states' turnpike authorities were competing in the bond markets for investor dollars. All of these issues combined made it difficult for OTA to issue bonds for its toll road. When funding had been obtained, political issues stalled the proposed toll road further.

With no counterpart to the south, the Kansas Turnpike ended at the state line, at an at-grade intersection with E0010 Road. Just across the state line was an oat field, into which many inattentive motorists crashed. This abrupt end became nationally famous after Wyoming Governor Milward L. Simpson and his wife crashed in mid-1957. The oat farmer plowed the field to provide a safer landing, and the KTA was persuaded to install a huge wooden barrier at the end of the highway. However, within a day, three more drivers had crashed and destroyed the barrier, so the KTA closed the turnpike south of the South Haven interchange. The KTA provided the state of Oklahoma with financial aid to construct its portion of a temporary road leading to the interchange. The lack of continuity in the highway was one of the primary reasons that the road did not generate much revenue in the years following the opening; another reason was a lack of education on the part of motorists as to the concept of a toll road.

Although Oklahoma's plans to construct a toll road from the southern end of the Kansas Turnpike at the state line to Oklahoma City did not materialize,  a year and a half after the opening of the turnpike, a  connection to US-177 was put into service. Eventually, I-35 was completed south to Oklahoma City.

Later history
While the initial turnpike was still being built, the KTA authorized four feasibility studies in October 1954. Three of them—a spur to Leavenworth and Saint Joseph, Missouri; a spur from Wichita to Hutchinson, Great Bend, and Hays; and a new Intercity Viaduct to Kansas City, Missouri—did not go anywhere. But the fourth proposal, a toll bridge on 18th Street in Kansas City, was pushed through, and the KTA agreed to build the turnpike in early 1956. The 18th Street Expressway, running south from the turnpike's east end over the Kansas River, opened in 1959, improving access to northeast Johnson County.

As the turnpike did not use any state tax revenue for maintenance, the pavement began to deteriorate rapidly, and crews faced difficulty keeping up with the snow in winter conditions in a winter storm during 1960. In the early 1960s, many senior positions in the KTA were cut, and, thanks to this and other austerity measures, such as targeting maintenance to save costs in the future, the turnpike slowly became profitable. By 1966, it was clear that the turnpike had not been built to the higher standards of the Interstate Highway System; the roadway had developed ruts and other issues due to deferred maintenance. To temporarily fix the problem, a layer of asphalt oil and a layer of sand and asphalt was used to fill in the ruts, and graded rock coated with asphalt was used to seal the road. Since the road had been originally constructed at the same time, and not built in segments over a period of time, similar maintenance issues appeared along the whole length of the road at the same time. Bridges and pavement were repaired on a rotating basis, to stagger the cost of needed repairs. The bridge over the Kansas River was widened and replaced after 1973. As economic conditions improved for the Authority, equipment was slowly replaced, and workers were given pay increases, both of which were badly needed.

In June 1956, the Federal Aid Highway Act of 1956 was signed into law, granting funding to the nationwide Interstate Highway System. Without its Oklahoma link, the Kansas Turnpike was in danger of being bypassed by the Interstate System entirely. However, at the end of 1956, the Bureau of Public Roads and the state of Kansas agreed to route I-35 along the turnpike south of Emporia and I-70 along the piece east of Topeka. The state insisted on a separate Emporia–Kansas City alignment, and the mileage that would have been used to build I-35 from Wichita to Emporia via Newton was instead used for I-35W (now I-135) from Wichita via Newton to Salina. Oklahoma's first piece of I-35, from the state line to US-177 at Braman, opened April 22, 1958.

The East Topeka interchange was completely rebuilt in the late 1990s, with a goal of rerouting I-70 and improving access to the turnpike. The design was completed in 1997, and the project was finished in 2001 at a cost of $98.6 million in 1999 (equivalent to $ in ).

On the evening of April 6, 2002, a grease fire broke out in the Hardee's restaurant at the Belle Plaine service plaza. Exacerbated by heavy winds, the fire destroyed the building, which also contained a travel information center. Four fire departments responded to the scene. The assistant fire chief and fire chief of the Wellington Fire Department gave conflicting statements on whether the unavailability of the Wellington water tower, which had been emptied while it was being repainted, had hampered efforts to extinguish the blaze. The fire burned for three hours, with hot spots still smoldering the following day. No injuries were reported. The fire caused $2 million (equivalent  to $ in ) in damages. The service plaza was rebuilt, with a reopening celebration occurring on July 24, 2003.

A thunderstorm that evening dropped large amounts of rain in the area, with a gauge at Plymouth reporting  of rainfall in a 24-hour period. The culvert carrying Jacobs Creek under the turnpike quickly exceeded its capacity, and water rose onto the turnpike. Seven cars, all headed northbound, stalled in the floodwater. Six people died in the flood.

Another flooding event, this one a 100-year flood, caused a portion of the Kansas Turnpike to close in 2019. As a result, just after midnight, the KTA made the decision to close the turnpike between Wellington and the Oklahoma state line. The turnpike reopened as of May 10.

Tolls

The turnpike runs on a ticket-based collection system. When entering the turnpike, either at one of the terminuses or at an interchange, a driver is issued a ticket which indicates the toll plaza at which they entered. When leaving the turnpike, this ticket is used to determine the amount of the toll. If a motorist presents a ticket at the same toll plaza it was issued from, the KTA charges a "per-minute" fare if the trip was more than 15 minutes. Should the ticket be lost, or should the trip take over 18 hours to complete, the driver must pay the highest possible toll for that exit. Drivers in vehicles with more than two axles, such as truckers, pay higher tolls than two-axle vehicles.

As an alternative to using tickets, motorists can buy a transponder, known as a K-TAG. K-TAG customers can proceed slowly through the toll plaza without stopping to collect a ticket or pay toll. The toll is instead paid through one of two payment plans. K-TAG Classic, intended for frequent turnpike users, requires the customer to maintain a prepaid account, from which funds are drawn as needed. The plan intended for intermittent users, My K-TAG, requires an active credit card. My K-TAG keeps track of the tolls accrued by the customer and automatically charges the user's credit card monthly. K-TAG Classic accounts are subject to a $1 monthly fee per tag, while My K-TAG account holders can get up to five tags for free. Tolls for K-TAG users are lower than for cash customers, so a two-axle vehicle with a K-TAG is charged only $11.15 to travel the entire length of the turnpike, while the same vehicle is charged $15 when paying in cash. K-TAG Classic users also receive an additional 10-percent discount on tolls.

K-TAG was introduced in 1995; the system was internally designed and is internally run instead of being contracted to another company, saving additional overhead costs. The Kansas Turnpike is completely self-sustaining and operated on a cash surplus of nearly $600 million (equivalent to $ in ) at end of fiscal year 2017. All costs are paid for by the tolls collected; no tax money is used for construction, maintenance, or administration. The KTA estimates that 120,000 drivers use the turnpike each day.

K-TAG is compatible with NationalPass, used in several other states; PikePass, in neighboring Oklahoma; and TxTag, EZ TAG, and TollTag in Texas. It is compatible with the SunPass system in Florida, but not currently on roads maintained by the Central Florida Expressway Authority. However, K-TAG is not compatible with any other systems, such as the E-ZPass system in the eastern United States.

Exit 53A in Wichita, which opened in 2021, contains a cashless tolling gantry rather than a toll plaza. Drivers without a K-TAG must pay their toll online.

Route description

, the Kansas Turnpike has 22 interchanges and two barrier toll plazas. Many of the interchanges are designed as trumpet interchanges with a connector road to the crossroad, for easy placement of a single toll plaza on the connector.

Exit numbers were originally sequential but are assigned today by mileage from south to east, the same numbering system used by the majority of US states for their Interstate Highways as well. After passing the Bonner Springs interchange, exit numbers change to match the mileage of I-70 east from the Colorado border, which is also used on I-70 west of the turnpike. This results in discontinuous exit numbers on I-70.

Oklahoma state line to Emporia
The first  of the highway, between its southern terminus at the Oklahoma border and Emporia, Kansas, are designated as I-35. The Kansas Turnpike is the only tolled section on this Interstate. The turnpike runs due north and south between its southern terminus and Wichita. This stretch of the highway runs parallel to US-81, which lies to the west of the turnpike.

The Kansas Turnpike begins at the Oklahoma state line north of Braman, Oklahoma. This is also the point at which I-35 crosses from Kay County to Sumner County. The turnpike proceeds due north from the state line, with no interchanges for its first  in Kansas. The southernmost interchange on the turnpike is exit 4 (South Haven), which serves US-166. US-166 heads east to Arkansas City and west to US-81 at South Haven. This interchange is a four-ramp folded diamond with ramps in the southeast and northwest quadrants. It has no toll plazas, as it lies south of the southern barrier toll. Northbound traffic must exit at US-166 to avoid paying a toll. Initially, the interchange provided only a southbound exit and northbound entrance, forcing drivers who did not wish to pay a toll to leave I-35 in Oklahoma. By 1976, the other two ramps had been added.

From exit 4, the turnpike continues on a due north course, crossing Slate Creek, before coming to the Southern Terminal barrier toll plaza, where tickets are issued for all northbound traffic, and fares are collected from southbound traffic. The next interchange north of the toll plaza is exit 19 (Wellington), serving US-160, which heads west to Wellington, the county seat of Sumner County, and east to Winfield, the seat of adjoining Cowley County. It is the first of many trumpet interchanges serving the surface road via a connector road with a toll plaza. When the turnpike first opened, the US-160 interchange was a reverse diamond with four loop ramps, so that all traffic using the interchange had to pass under the bridge and thus through the toll plaza. The new configuration was built .

The freeway takes a brief jog to the northeast before crossing over a Burlington Northern Santa Fe rail line southeast of Riverdale. In the median at mile 26 is the Belle Plaine Service Area. North of the service plaza, the highway bridges the Ninnescah River and then K-55/East 90th Avenue North. No interchange is present to allow turnpike travelers to connect to the K-55.

The turnpike's next interchange is exit 33 (Mulvane), which connects to K-53/East 119th Street South via a trumpet ramp, just east of the west end of K-53 at US-81. The interchange was built . It was reconstructed in 2011 to serve the Kansas Star Casino with roundabouts on each side of the flyover. The east roundabout directs traffic to K-53. The west roundabout directs traffic to the casino. There is now a toll booth on the casino side of the intersection as well as the one on the entrance to K-53. This interchange straddles the Sumner–Sedgwick county line.

In southern Sedgwick County, the Kansas Turnpike enters the Wichita metropolitan area. Exit 39 (Haysville) serves two of Wichita's southern suburbs. This exit is a diamond interchange with a connector road (South Mead Drive) to East 71st Street South, which runs west to US-81 and Haysville and east to Derby. It was built . Now in Wichita proper, the highway reaches exit 42 (South Wichita), which is the south end of I-135. I-135 heads north through Wichita, the largest city in Kansas, toward Salina; US-81 joins at the first interchange and I-235 begins at the second. The interchange is a simple trumpet with I-135, and opened in 1956 with the turnpike, but the connector ended at 47th Street (now US-81) until .

After passing exit 42, the turnpike curves away from US-81, turning northeast toward El Dorado and Emporia. It crosses the Arkansas River between exits 42 and 45. Exit 45 (Wichita) is a trumpet connection to K-15/Southeast Boulevard and Turnpike Drive in southern Wichita. It opened in 1956 as one of the original interchanges. As the highway continues northeast through Wichita, it comes to exit 50 (East Wichita), a double-trumpet connection to the parallel Kellogg Avenue, which carries US-54 and US-400. It is one of the original 1956 interchanges. Exit 53, the final Wichita exit, is a trumpet connection to the K-96 freeway. The connector road junctions K-96 at a four-ramp partial cloverleaf interchange and ends at North 127th Street East. The interchange opened  along with the nearby piece of K-96.

East of exit 53, the turnpike passes into Butler County. Exit 57 (Andover) connects to East 21st Street northeast of downtown Andover, an eastern suburb of Wichita. The turnpike uses a diamond interchange with the connector road (Southwest Cross Road) to East 21st Street. This interchange opened . It crosses the Whitewater River southwest of the Towanda Service Area in the median at mile 65. From the service area, the highway proceeds northeast to exit 71 (El Dorado), a trumpet connection to K-254 just east of its junction with K-196. The connector originally directly intersected K-254, but it now ends between K-254/West Central Avenue and West 6th Avenue at Boyer Road just north of K-254. Exit 71 opened with the original turnpike in 1956. North of El Dorado, exit 76 (El Dorado) connects the Kansas Turnpike to US-77/North Main Street via a trumpet ramp. It opened .

After passing through El Dorado, the Kansas Turnpike crosses the northernmost arms of El Dorado Lake. This marks the turnpike's entry into the Flint Hills, a band of hills in eastern Kansas. The turnpike does not leave this region completely until it reaches Topeka. As the highway continues northeast past El Dorado Lake, it runs roughly parallel to the Walnut River to the west, which feeds the reservoir, and K-177 to the east. Northwest of the town of Cassoday, K-177 finally crosses the turnpike, with exit 92 (Cassoday), a diamond interchange, providing a connector to the state highway. The interchange was not present when the turnpike opened in 1956 but was built soon after as an east-facing folded diamond with two separate toll plazas. The present configuration was built c. 1995. Near this interchange, the turnpike crosses the Walnut River.

Northeast of the Cassoday interchange, the Kansas Turnpike enters Chase County. In the median at mile 97, just north of the county line, is the Matfield Green Service Area. Other than these two service exits, there are no interchanges within Chase County; upon leaving it, the turnpike passes into Lyon County.

The next interchange along the turnpike is exit 127 (Emporia). At this trumpet interchange, I-35 leaves the turnpike to head east through Emporia, the county seat of Lyon County, on its way northeast to Kansas City via Ottawa. The interchange, as opened in 1956 with the original turnpike, connected directly to US-50 at Overlander Street; a different configuration opened  along with the connecting piece of I-35. In 2005, the KTA approved reconstruction of the Emporia interchange to improve connections to US-50, I-35, and the city of Emporia, resulting in the present configuration. This project, funded by the KTA, the Kansas Department of Transportation (KDOT), and the city of Emporia, was completed in 2008.

Emporia to Topeka

After the split with I-35, the Kansas Turnpike continues northeast as I-335. However, its exits are numbered as if I-35 had continued along it. This highway exists entirely as a part of the Kansas Turnpike. In fact, until 1987, this stretch of the turnpike was designated solely as the Kansas Turnpike without an Interstate number.

Northeast of Emporia, the Emporia Service Area is in the median at mile 132. The turnpike continues northeast through the northern reaches of the Flint Hills, coming to an interchange with US-56 near Admire. This interchange, exit 147, is the only interchange along the I-335 section of the turnpike other than the two end junctions. It is a trumpet connection to US-56, which heads west to Council Grove and east to Osage City, and was one of the original 1956 interchanges.

From the Admire exit, the Kansas Turnpike continues northeast, passing through the southeast corner of Wabaunsee County and the northwestern part of Osage County. The turnpike enters Shawnee County and continues through rural land before it heads into the Topeka area. Here, the roadway has an interchange that serves I-470 and US-75 at exit 177. At this point, I-335 ends and I-470 joins the turnpike as it passes through suburban development in the southeastern part of Topeka. In the eastern portion of the city, the highway reaches an interchange with I-70, US-40, and K-4 at exits 182 and 183.

Topeka to Kansas City
The remainder of the turnpike runs on I-70 from Topeka to the turnpike's eastern terminus in Kansas City. This is one of only two tolled sections of I-70. The turnpike continues east along I-70 and crosses Tecumseh Creek. The Topeka Service Area is located on the north side of the road east of here at mile 188. It is accessed by ramps on the right side of the highway in both directions. Just east of the service area, the turnpike enters Douglas County while passing over US-40 without an interchange. The route then curves to the southeast and runs roughly parallel to US-40. A series of curves takes the turnpike farther east as it reaches exit 197 (Lecompton), a folded diamond interchange with the western terminus of K-10. After this, the highway continues farther east and enters the city of Lawrence, where it shares a diamond interchange with McDonald Drive at exit 202 (West Lawrence). McDonald Drive leads to US-59 south of the turnpike. East of here, the highway bends east-northeasterly, crosses the Kansas River, and then intersects US-40 and US-59, which run concurrently, at exit 204 (East Lawrence).

The Kansas Turnpike then leaves Lawrence and bends to the northeast before leaving Douglas County and entering Leavenworth. It overpasses Mud Creek before passing under K-32. Northeast of here at mile 209, the Lawrence Service Area is in the median. Afterward, the turnpike has a diamond interchange with 222nd Street, which is signed as Leavenworth County Road 1, at exit 212 (Tonganoxie/Eudora). The highway then travels northeast and passes through it eastern terminal toll booth. This is the final toll booth on the route traveling east, and all vehicles must pay their final toll before continuing. The turnpike then enters Bonner Springs. It crosses Wolf Creek before leaving Leavenworth County and entering Wyandotte County. In Bonner Springs, the turnpike intersects K-7, westbound US-24, westbound US-40, and the southern terminus of US-73 at exit 224 (Bonner Springs, formerly exit 223) with a trumpet interchange. This is the first free exit eastbound. The mileposts on the route switch to match those of I-70 after this interchange.

US-24 and US-40 run concurrently with I-70 and the Kansas Turnpike as it heads east toward Kansas City. Exit 410 on the turnpike is a diamond interchange with North 110th Street. This interchange is located just south of the Kansas Speedway. Just east of here, the route intersects I-435 at exit 411. This exit uses a cloverleaf interchange with one directional ramp and collector–distributor roads to avoid issues with traffic exiting immediately north of the turnpike. After this interchange, the highway enters Kansas City.

The turnpike's first exit in the city is exit 414, a diamond interchange with North 78th Street. Next, the highway curves slightly to the northeast and intersects the Turner Diagonal at exit 415, an interchange consisting of a half-cloverleaf interchange for the western ramps and a Y-interchange for the eastern ramps that intersects the Turner Diagonal at a trumpet interchange north of the turnpike. East of here, the route has a diamond interchange with North 57th Street at exit 417. Directly east of North 57th Street, the turnpike crosses Brenner Heights Creek. After this, the turnpike continues due east to a fully directional interchange with I-635 at exit 418.

After this interchange, the freeway bends in a southeastern direction and reaches its final exit, exit 420. This exit is a cloverleaf interchange with US-69, which is also known as the 18th Street Expressway. At this interchange, US-69 turns east to overlap I-70, US-40, and US-24, and the highways continue east of exit 420 toward Kansas City, Missouri.

Design

Because the Kansas Turnpike was built before the Interstate Highway System, it is not engineered to current Interstate Highway standards; however, as with all other toll roads that predated the Interstate Highway System, the highway is grandfathered from Interstate standards. Notably, the turnpike was built without a  median. When it opened, the central reservation was a  depressed median. Starting in 1985, Jersey barriers were installed along its entire length.

Kansas Turnpike mileposts are continuous along the entire length of the turnpike. Originally, milepost numbering began with 0 at the junction of the 18th Street Expressway and counted up as one traveled west then south, with milepost 236 appearing at the southern terminus. Then, in 1973, the KTA completely reversed the numbering, and now milemarkers begin at the point where I-35 enters Kansas at the southern border. These numbers are continued along the other three Interstates that make up the turnpike, rather than numbering each Interstate individually, leading to discontinuous numbering on I-70—the exit numbers on tolled I-70 are much lower than those on free I-70.

The majority of the Kansas Turnpike, from the Oklahoma state line to Topeka, was constructed with  asphalt. The  from Topeka to Kansas City was built with Portland cement concrete. Curves along the turnpike are limited to 3° and grades limited to 3%. When built, the turnpike was designed to allow  axle loads. The  right-of-way featured fenced edges to prevent cattle from entering the roadway and to discourage toll evasion.

Speed limits
When the turnpike was originally opened, it had no posted speed limit, however "drivers [would] be 'hailed down' if they exceed[ed] ".

Other sections through urban areas remained at the lower limits as well. KDOT requested an Interstate designation for the Emporia–Topeka segment of the turnpike by May 1987, which they received on October 23, 1987, when that section was given the I-335 designation to allow for a  speed limit. Later, in November 1995, Congress repealed the National Maximum Speed Limit; Kansas initially left their limits alone after the repeal. Legislation that raised the speed limits to  took effect on March 22, 1996.

Services

The KTA provides a number of services to help motorists and provide incentives for using the turnpike. KTA broadcasts a travel radio station at 1610 AM from Wellington, Wichita, El Dorado, Cassoday, Emporia, Admire, East Topeka, and West Lawrence. Law enforcement is provided by a separate Turnpike Division of the Kansas Highway Patrol. Motorists needing assistance can use a roadside assistance hotline by dialing *KTA (*582) on a mobile phone. Statewide weather and traffic conditions can be accessed by dialing 511. The KTA also provides weather and traffic information on their website.

There are six service areas located along the highway:
The Belle Plaine Service Area (mile 26) opened on July 24, 2003, replacing a previous structure at the site that had been destroyed by a grease fire. It contains a 24-hour gas station and convenience store, a fast food restaurant, a weather kiosk, a Kansas Travel Information Center, and a gift shop.
The Towanda Service Area (mile 65) provides a 24-hour gas station and convenience store, a fast food restaurant, and a weather kiosk.
The Matfield Green Service Area (mile 97) shares the design of the Towanda service area, and also provides a 24-hour gas station and convenience store, a fast food restaurant, and a weather kiosk.  The service area at Matfield Green also contains a  memorial to Notre Dame football coach Knute Rockne, who died in a 1931 plane crash near Bazaar, a few miles north of the service area.
The Emporia Service Area (mile 132), like the two service areas to the south, includes a 24-hour gas station and convenience store and a fast food restaurant. Additionally, the facility provides an outdoor exercise area and playground for children.
The Topeka Service Area (mile 188) opened in May 2002. This service plaza features a choice of five restaurants (one of which is open 24 hours), as well as a gift shop and a 24-hour gas station and convenience store. Prior to this plaza's opening, a service area was in the median between exits 182 and 183. It closed in May 2002 when the present Topeka Service Area opened.
The Lawrence Service Area (mile 209) consists of a 24-hour gas station and convenience store, in addition to a 24-hour fast food restaurant.

Exit list

See also

Footnotes

References

External links

 Kansas Turnpike Authority
 Kansas Highway Maps: Current, Historic, KDOT
 Kansas Turnpike Authority Annual Reports (KGI Library)
 Publications by Kansas Turnpike Authority in KGI Online Library
 Driven By Vision (Short history of Kansas Turnpike at KGI Online Library)]

Freeways in the United States
Interstate 35
Interstate 70
Toll roads in Kansas
Tolled sections of Interstate Highways
Transportation in Sumner County, Kansas
Transportation in Sedgwick County, Kansas
Transportation in Butler County, Kansas
Transportation in Chase County, Kansas
Transportation in Lyon County, Kansas
Transportation in Wabaunsee County, Kansas
Transportation in Osage County, Kansas
Transportation in Shawnee County, Kansas
Transportation in Douglas County, Kansas
Transportation in Leavenworth County, Kansas
Transportation in Wyandotte County, Kansas
1956 establishments in Kansas